The Comunidade Intermunicipal Viseu Dão Lafões is an administrative division in Portugal. It replaced the previously existing Greater Metropolitan Area of Viseu. Since January 2015, Viseu Dão Lafões is also a NUTS3 subregion of Centro Region, that covers the same area as the intermunicipal community. The main city and seat of the intermunicipal community is Viseu. The population in 2011 was 267,633, in an area of 3,237.74 km².

Municipalities 

The intermunicipal community Viseu Dão Lafões consists of 14 municipalities:

References

External links
Official website Viseu Dão Lafões

Intermunicipal communities of Portugal
Centro Region, Portugal